Eurodicautom was the pioneering terminology database of the European Commission, created in 1975, initially for use by translators and other Commission staff. By 1980 it was consultable on line within the Commission. As the European Community grew it was expanded from six to seven, nine and finally eleven languages (plus Latin for scientific names). Public user interfaces were added later, providing the general public with free access to multilingual terminology in the fields of activity of the European Union. The students of Rennes University UFR2, LEA, technical translator and terminologist department, regularly worked on reviewing  and creating entries to the existing database in several languages. 

In 2007, Eurodicautom was replaced by Interactive Terminology for Europe (IATE).

External links
 IATE - European Terminology Database

Government databases of the European Union
Language policy of the European Union
Translation databases